Kosenko (Ukrainian and Russian: Косенко) is a Russian and Ukrainian surname.

 Alexis Kossenko (born 1977), French musician
 Dmitry Sergeyevich Kosenko (born 1986), Russian footballer
 Ihor Kosenko, Ukrainian Paralympic footballer
 Mikhail Kosenko (born 1975), Russian activist
 Viktor Kosenko (1896–1938), Ukrainian composer

See also
 
 Kosenkov

Ukrainian-language surnames